Ropes Independent School District is a public school district based in Ropesville, Texas (USA).

Located in Hockley County, a small portion of the district extends into Terry County.

Ropes ISD has one school that serves students in grades pre-kindergarten through twelve.

In 2009, the school district was rated "academically acceptable" by the Texas Education Agency.

Special programs

Athletics
Ropes High School plays six-man football.

References

External links
Ropes ISD

School districts in Hockley County, Texas
School districts in Terry County, Texas